Lindsay Michelle Zullo (born 3 May 1991) is an American-born Haitian footballer who plays as a forward. She has been a member of the Haiti women's national team.

Early years
Zullo a native of Hudson, Florida, played varsity during her junior and senior years at Hudson High School leading her team to a pair of district championships. Named captain as a senior, she participated in the Senior All-Star Game. She became an honorable mention All-State selection, named Pasco County Player of the Year and earned first-team All-Conference honors.

Zullo played 47 games, totaling 54 goals (1.1 gpg) and 21 assists; all far above national averages.

Club career
Zullo plays for F.C. Indiana, based out of New Paris, Indiana, of the Women’s Professional Soccer League (WPSL) and was selected as a WPSL All-Star for the region in 2014.

International career
In 2014, Zullo debuted for the Haiti women's national football team, leading the selection to a third-place finish in the Caribbean Cup scoring a goal against Trinidad and Tobago.

At the opening of the 2014 CONCACAF Women's Championship, Zullo scored a goal against Guatemala  that won the game 1-0.

Zullo was recruited by Shek Borkowski, head coach of the Haitian selection and also at F.C. Indiana, who was actively recruiting Haitian-American players.

References

External links 
 

1991 births
Living people
Citizens of Haiti through descent
Haitian women's footballers
Women's association football forwards
Haiti women's international footballers
Competitors at the 2014 Central American and Caribbean Games
Haitian people of American descent
Haitian people of Italian descent
People from Hudson, Florida
Soccer players from Florida
American women's soccer players
College women's soccer players in the United States
Flagler College alumni
F.C. Indiana players
American sportspeople of Haitian descent
American people of Italian descent
Sportspeople from the Tampa Bay area